"Olingi Nini" (Lingala for "What you want") is a song recorded by Congolese singer Gaz Mawete that was a massive huge success for his career and gain over 4.3 million views on YouTube.

See also 

 KeBlack
 Youssoupha
 Fally Ipupa
 Naza (rapper)

References 

Gaz Mawete songs
2018 songs